The 1964 United States Senate special election in Tennessee was held on November 3, 1964, concurrently with the U.S. presidential election as well the other regularly scheduled U.S. Senate election for the seat which was held by Albert Gore Sr. As well as other elections to the United States Senate in other states as well as elections to the United States House of Representatives and various state and local elections. Following the death of Senator Estes Kefauver, Governor Frank G. Clement appointed Herbert S. Walters to fill the vacancy until the special election could take place.

Democrat Ross Bass won the election, he defeated Republican Howard Baker.

Democratic primary

Candidates
Ross Bass, U.S. Representative
Frank G. Clement, Governor of Tennessee
M. M. Bullard

Results

Republican primary

Candidates
Howard Baker
Charlie Moffett
Hubert David Patty

Results

Results

See also
1964 United States Senate elections

References

1964
Tennessee
United States Senate
Tennessee 1964
Tennessee 1964
United States Senate 1964